Tri-County Community College is a public community college in Murphy, North Carolina. It was founded in 1964 and is part of the North Carolina Community College System.

History

1964: North Carolina Board of Education approved Tri-County Industrial Education Center operation
1965: Cherokee County Board of Education negotiates lease agreement for occupation by college of the abandoned Cherokee County Prison Camp
1970s: Renovation and construction of three buildings on the Murphy campus (now renamed Tri-County Community College) completed.
1984: NC Legislature allocation of funds for construction of new multi-purpose building
1989: Complete of new multi-purpose building named the Enloe building (named for State Legislature Jeff Enloe, whose support of the college enabled successful appropriate of funds for building construction)
1993: Passing of a Statewide Bond Referendum to fund the Graham County Center.
1995: Land and buildings conveyed for Graham County Center.
1998: Opening of Graham County Center.
1998: Dedication of a new building for dual use as a Student Activities Center and an early childhood education center both aptly named to honor worthy school supporters.  Then president Norman Oglesby named one building for himself. Student Activities wing is named for Sarah Easley Harper originator of the Student Support Center. Early childhood education wing is named the Jarrett/Oglesby Center.

Presidents

Holland McSwain — First President
Vincent Crisp – President from 1972-1992
Harry Jarrett - President from 1992 to 1995
Norman Oglesby - President from 1996 to 2006. During his presidency hundreds of thousands of dollars of state funds went unaccounted for
Donna Tipton-Rogers (2008 - )

Accreditations
Commission on College of the Southern Association of Colleges and Schools to award associate degrees.
Approved by the North Carolina Board of Cosmetic Arts
Approved by the North Carolina Board of Nursing

Service area
Tri-County Community College serves the counties of:

Cherokee
Clay
Graham

Local Cities

Andrews
Hayesville
Murphy
Robbinsville

Campus
There are three campus locations, the Main Campus in Murphy, and the Graham County Center in Robbinsville, and the Cherokee County Center of Applied Technology in Marble. The main campus has three buildings; named McSwain, in honor of Holland McSwain, Tri-County Community College’s First President; West, for Herman West, a State Legislator and entrepreneur; and Crisp, for Vincent Crisp, Tri-County Community College President from 1972–1992.

College publications
The Tri-County Communicator is the student newspaper of TCCC

References

External links
Official website

North Carolina Community College System colleges
Universities and colleges accredited by the Southern Association of Colleges and Schools
Education in Cherokee County, North Carolina
Education in Graham County, North Carolina
Buildings and structures in Cherokee County, North Carolina
Buildings and structures in Graham County, North Carolina
Two-year colleges in the United States